The  is a Japanese photography award.

The award has been given every year since 1975 (except 1983) by the Asahi Shimbun Company, publisher of Asahi Shimbun and the magazine Asahi Camera, in honor of the photographer Ihei Kimura. It is given to one or more new photographers whose work has been exhibited or published during the previous year and is announced in Asahi Camera: its original name, soon shortened, was Asahi Kamera Kimura Ihei Shashin-shō.

The award is usually given to a single photographer. In 2000, the unprecedented awarding of three prizes, each to a female photographer, caused a stir.

Its major rival for attention in the mass media is the Domon Ken Award, given annually to a single photographer, usually one with a longer career than those who win the Kimura Award.

Winners

Notes

Bibliography
 Kimura Ihei Shashinshō no nijūnen ("20 years of the Kimura Ihei Award". Mōru, 1995. . With sample photographs from each of the award-winners (more from each of them than appear in the later, thirty-year compilation).
 Kimura Ihei Shashinshō no kiseki: 1975–1999 ("Remains of the Kimura Ihei Award: 1975–1999"). An exhibition catalogue. 
 Sanjūroku fotogurafāzu: Kimura Ihei Shashinshō no sanjūnen ("36 photographers: 30 years of the Kimura Ihei Award"). Tokyo: Asahi Shinbun, 2005. . With sample photographs from each of the award-winners.

External links
 Site within that of Asahi Shinbun. 
Edan Corkill, "Prize-winning photographers put medium's evolution in focus", Asahi.com, 20 May 2005. Exhibition review.

Asahi Shimbun Company
Awards established in 1975
Japanese awards
Photography in Japan
Photography awards